Bettina Streussel is an East German sprint canoer who competed in the early 1980s. She won two gold medals at the 1982 ICF Canoe Sprint World Championships in Belgrade, earning them in the K-2 500 m and K-4 500 m events.

References

East German female canoeists
Living people
Year of birth missing (living people)
ICF Canoe Sprint World Championships medalists in kayak